Let the Record Show: Dexys Do Irish and Country Soul is a 2016 album by Dexys, the band formerly known as Dexys Midnight Runners. The album includes interpretations of Irish songs and other select compositions. It reached number 10 in the UK Albums Chart on 10 June 2016.

Kevin Rowland said about the album:

"We had the idea to do this album in 1984 or 1985. It was to be called Irish and was to feature songs like 'Carrickfergus', 'Curragh of Kildare' and 'Women of Ireland' – all of which are featured here. Dexys broke up not too long afterwards, so it didn't happen."

He added: "The album is called Dexys DO Irish and Country Soul: DO it, not BECOME it. We're not trying to be Irish, and we haven't used too many Celtic instruments on there. It's our sound. We're bringing our style to these songs."

Tim Sommer, writing in Observer, called it "the most surprising album of 2016" and  an "amazing, subtle, powerful, visceral album that lays bare the soul, memories and losses of Kevin Rowland".

Track listing

"Women of Ireland" (Peadar Ó Doirnín, Seán Ó Riada)	
"To Love Somebody" (Barry Gibb, Robin Gibb)	
"Smoke Gets in Your Eyes" (Jerome Kern, Louis Houzeau, Otto Harbach, Paul Ganne)
"Curragh of Kildare" (Traditional)	
"I'll Take You Home Again, Kathleen" (Thomas P. Westendorf)	
"You Wear It Well" (Martin Quittenton, Rod Stewart)	
"Forty Shades of Green" (Johnny Cash)	
"How Do I Live" (Dianne Warren)	
"Grazing in the Grass" (Harry Elston, Philemon Hou)
"The Town I Loved So Well" (Phil Coulter)	
"Both Sides Now" (Joni Mitchell)	
"Carrickfergus" (Traditional)	

Bonus

"To Love Somebody" (solo vocal)	
"Smoke Gets in Your Eyes" (solo vocal)	
"Curragh of Kildare" (solo vocal)	
"I'll Take You Home Again, Kathleen" (solo vocal)	
"How Do I Live" (solo vocal)	
"Grazing in the Grass" (solo vocal)	
"The Town I Loved So Well" (solo vocal)	
"Carrickfergus" (solo vocal)	
"How Do I Live" (instrumental)	
"Grazing in the Grass" (instrumental)	
"Both Sides Now" (instrumental)

Personnel
Adapted from the album booklet.

Kevin Rowland - vocals
Sean Read - vocals, Hammond organ
Mary Pearce - vocals
Lucy Morgan - viola
Helen O'Hara - violin
Big Jimmy Paterson - trombone
Matt Child - keyboards
Michael Timothy - keyboards
Tim Cansfield - guitar
Dave Ruffy - drums
C J Jones - drums
Andy Hobson - bass guitar
Ben Trigg - cello, string arrangements
Tom Pigott-Smith - violin
Alice Pratley - violin
Kirsty Mangan - violin
Graham Pike - chromatic harmonica
Camilla Pay - harp
Jody Linscott - percussion
Gavin Fitzjohn - trumpet
Kim Chandler - backing vocals

References 

Dexys Midnight Runners albums
2016 albums